Marc Vampa (born 8 June 1946 in Paris) is a member of the National Assembly of France.  He represents the Eure department, and is a member of the New Centre.

He is a former scientist and managed his own computer company, before becoming a trader in Bernay. 

He became mayor of Beaumesnil, Eure in 2001, and General Councillor of the District of Beaumesnil since 1997.

References

1946 births
Living people
Scientists from Paris
Politicians from Paris
The Centrists politicians
Union of Democrats and Independents politicians
Deputies of the 13th National Assembly of the French Fifth Republic
Mayors of places in Normandy